Matt Wilkinson is a professional Australian surfer. Known for being a goofyfooter, Wilkinson is from a small town called Copacabana in New South Wales. In 2016, he won his first two Championship Tour events.

Career victories

References

Living people
Year of birth missing (living people)
Place of birth missing (living people)
People from the Central Coast (New South Wales)
Australian surfers
21st-century Australian people
World Surf League surfers